The 2006 Canadian Figure Skating Championships took place from January 9 to 15, 2006 at the TD Place Arena in Ottawa, Ontario. It is an annual figure skating competition held by Skate Canada, the nation's figure skating governing body. Skaters competed at the senior and junior levels in the disciplines of men's singles, women's singles, pair skating, and ice dancing. Although the official ISU terminology for female skaters in the singles category is ladies, Skate Canada's official terminology is women and that is the term used in the official results. Due to the number of entries, the men's and women's competition had a qualifying round and the qualifying round was split in half to accommodate all the skaters. The results of this competition were used to pick the Canadian teams to the 2006 Winter Olympics, the 2006 World Championships, the 2006 Four Continents Championships, and the 2006 World Junior Championships.

Senior results

Men

Women

Pairs

Ice dancing

Junior results

Men

Women

Pairs

Ice dancing

External links
 2006 BMO Financial Group Canadian Championships 

Canadian Figure Skating Championships
Canadian Figure Skating Championships
Sports competitions in Ottawa
2006 in Canadian sports
2006 in Ontario
January 2006 sports events in Canada
2000s in Ottawa